Alexander David Michael Bruce (born 5 July 1948 in Shimla, India) is a British entrepreneur who has been involved in the international brewing and leisure industry since 1966, in a career that has covered both production and retailing.

Early life
He attended Cheltenham College. His father died when he was young.

Career 
Bruce began his career in 1966, brewing with both Courage Brewery and Theakston Brewery (in North Yorkshire) for six years. This was immediately followed by six years licensed retail work with Charram Ltd and The Star Group of Companies.

Firkin Brewery

Bruce went on to found the Firkin Pub chain and Bruce's Brewery, which started as a single pub in Elephant and Castle, London, in 1979. Peter Austin oversaw his choice of kit and the design for its small basement brewery. He borrowed £10,000, secured against his house, and opened the Goose and Firkin at 47 Borough Road (A3202) next to the junction of Southwark Bridge Road and a railway bridge leading to Blackfriars station over the river to the north, and close to the Ministry of Sound and the Student Centre of the Polytechnic of the South Bank (now London South Bank University). The pub is now the Duke of York. By 1986 he had six Firkin pubs and ten by 1988, turning over £3m; at the time Britain had 75,000 pubs. The pubs sold their own beer, Dogbolter. Each pub cost around £250,000. The Firkin motto was Usque ad Mortem Bibendum.

In February 1988, Bruce put his eleven Firkin pubs up for sale, selling them for £6.6m in May 1988 to Midsummer Leisure. The chain would grow to 170 sites under a succession of owners until it was bought in 1999 by Punch Taverns, who retired the brand the following year. 

Following the sale of the Firkin pubs and Bruce's Brewery, Bruce, together with his wife, Louise, set up The Bruce Trust and Bruce Foundation to provide canal boats for holidays for the disabled.

The Capital Pub Company
Bruce was Non-Executive Director of The Capital Pub Company PLC, which he co-founded with Clive Watson. The Capital Pub Company PLC raised over £15million under the EIS and was admitted to AIM in June 2007. It was acquired by Greene King for £93m in July 2011.

Grosvenor Inns
Bruce was Executive Director of Grosvenor Inns PLC, where he was responsible for the roll-out of the Slug and Lettuce brand, where he worked with Tim Thwaites.

In October 2011, again with Clive Watson, Bruce co-founded The City Pub Co East and The City Pub Co West, raising £28m in EIS funds.

Cobbs Farm
Bruce is chairman of Cobbs Farm Co., a Hungerford-based multi-site farm shop business established in 2006 as The Country Food and Dining Company.

West Berkshire Brewery plc 
Bruce became chairman of West Berkshire Brewery plc on 28 March 2013, promoting the business to potential investors with the prospect of selling it for up to £150 million. The business went into administration on 23 December 2021, thereafter his appointment being terminated. According to the administrators, the collapse of the business reflected its unprofitability since 2016. Unsecured creditors included HMRC and Hawkridge Distillers.

In August 2021, several former staff of the West Berkshire Brewery plc made allegations against the West Berkshire Brewery plc of sexism and bullying.

Hawkridge Distillers Ltd 
It was announced on 15 August 2021 that Bruce was appointed non-executive chairman of Hawkridge Distillers Ltd, a gin distilling and marketing business.

The Renegade Pub Co.1 Ltd 
Bruce is a director of another brewing related enterprise which also went into administration, The Renegade Pub Co.1 Limited, with rental arrears of £18,000. This business was granted a Covid Bounce Back Loan of £50,000. Following the demise of this business, its remnants were sold to one of Bruce's business associates in 2022. Creditors include HM Revenue & Customs Debt Management, Islington Council and Metrobank.

Charities 
Bruce is the chair of the trustees of the Bruce Trust, a charity registered in 1988 which designed a small fleet of accessible canal boats based at Great Bedwyn on the Kennet and Avon Canal. In 2016, the boats were donated to the Kennet and Avon Canal Trust, which continues to administer and operate them.

Another charity registered in 2013, the Bruce Charitable Foundation, at first provided holidays at log cabins at Great Bedwyn wharf and elsewhere, and later provided motorhome holidays for disabled, disadvantaged or elderly people. It was removed from the register in 2019.

Honours 
Bruce was awarded an OBE in June 2021 for services to charity.

References

External links
 Official website

Living people
1948 births
British chief executives
British hospitality businesspeople
Businesspeople from Himachal Pradesh
Drinking establishment owners
English brewers
People educated at Cheltenham College
People from Hungerford
People from Shimla